Eugene Michael Guarilia (September 13, 1937 – November 20, 2016) was an American basketball player who played four seasons for the Boston Celtics of the National Basketball Association (NBA).

He attended Holy Rosary Grammar School and Duryea High School. Guarilia played freshman basketball for Potomac State College, a junior college in Keyser, West Virginia. He established a State Conference freshman record by scoring 595 points in 1953.

A 6'5" (1.96 m) forward Guarilia played for the George Washington University varsity basketball team beginning in the 1956–1957 season. He took the place of All-America Joe Holup, who went on to play for the Syracuse Nationals. In February 1957, Guarilia was averaging 17.1 points per game and was sixth in the NCAA in rebounding. In the twenty games he had played, Guarilia had snatched 353 rebounds. He was selected to the all Southern Conference basketball team in February 1958.

Guarilia was selected by the Boston Celtics in the second round of the 1959 NBA Draft.  Guarilia appeared in 129 games for the Celtics over four seasons (1959–1963), averaging 3.2 points and 2.3 rebounds per game.  He earned four NBA championship rings in his brief career.

In December 1959 Boston placed Guarilia on its farm out list to trim their roster to the required 10 player limit. Though officially off the Celtics' roster, he remained in Boston to be available if other players were injured. Red Auerbach considered rotating Guarilia on the active list with one of the other Celtics rookies, like John Richter. The coach said that this move could be done in accordance with NBA rules.

Guarilia was particularly effective in Boston's 1961–62 NBA championship victory over the Los Angeles Lakers. In the final moments of regulation, in the decisive seventh game, he stopped Elgin Baylor. The Celtics went on to win the game in overtime.

A new NBA rule allowed Guarilia to become the 11th man on the Boston roster in the (1962–63) NBA Championship versus the Lakers. On September 25, 1963, the Celtics placed Guarilia on waivers to reduce their playing squad to 16 players.

Post NBA 
Guarilia went on to teach health and physical education for many years at Duryea High School, which became Northeast High School, which in turn became Pittston Area Senior High School.

Pittston Area dedicated its court to Guarilia in January 2015, when it painted two shamrocks and Guarilia's No. 20 on the court.

Guaralia died on November 20, 2016.

Career statistics

NBA

Source

Regular season

Playoffs

References

External links

1937 births
2016 deaths
American men's basketball players
Basketball players from Pennsylvania
Boston Celtics draft picks
Boston Celtics players
George Washington Colonials men's basketball players
Junior college men's basketball players in the United States
People from Luzerne County, Pennsylvania
Potomac State Catamounts basketball players
Power forwards (basketball)
Small forwards